The statue of Our Lady of Miracles, Jaffna patão is a wooden statue, now preserved in the church of São Pedro, in Bainguinim, Goa, India.

The historical origin of the devotion to our Lady of Miracles Jaffnapatão 

In 1614, Friar Francisco de S. Antonio who was the Rector of Our Lady of Victory, Jaffnapatao (Nossa Senhora da Vitória, Jafanapatão) wanted a statue for the church altar. The friar asked a local sculptor named Annacutti to carve a statue from a piece of wood he had brought with him from Cochin. The statue of the Virgin Mary, holding her infant son in her arms while being carved already become a miraculous statue. People went to Annacutti's house to pray before the statue and many reported to have been cured. Even those prayed holding the wood shavings got cured through the intercession of Virgin Mary. Some who showed disrespect to the statue experienced the wrath of God. Annacutti witnessed these miracles was both amazed and frightened and dared not to proceed with the work and requested the friar to take the unfinished statue to the church. On 24 July 1614, the statue was taken in a public procession from the sculptor’s house to the Church and as the procession passed through the streets where the royal palaces were located, the King and the royal family appeared to view the procession. The statue was placed on an altar in the middle of the church.

Due to numerous miracles attributed to the statue; she was called Our Lady of Miracles (புதுமை மாதா / Puthumai Matha), Jaffnapatao. People from other parts of Ceylon, as well from neighbouring regions such as Santhome, Nagapattinam went on pilgrimage to Our Lady of Miracles. Our Lady of Miracles Jaffnapatao is said to have cured the sick and the disabled, win battles and protected the people from natural disasters that struck them on land and at sea. Miracles convinced many to be baptized and Annacutti, the sculptor of the statue later wanted to be baptized and received his baptism. The first stone for the new church, Our Lady of Miracles Jaffnapatao was laid on 8 May 1614, on the feast of the Glorious Ascension of Jesus and it became the main church in Jaffna Kingdom.

During the 1620 revolt led by Migapulle Arachchi with the help of Thanjavur Nayak and Badagas mercenaries to capture Jaffna, the wives of the Portuguese who heard gun shots sought shelter inside the sanctuary that had the statue of Our Lady of Miracles and prayed for her help. There was an intense brightness and they couldn’t bear to see and bowed their heads down. The statue that is imperfect and unpainted was seen by all as if the face and hands were coloured with vermillion. It remained in that status for two weeks during which period the Portuguese defeated their enemy. Victory was gained on 1 February 1621, and on the following day a Solemn High Mass was sung.  Chief Captain Filipe de Oliveira who never went to battle without first dipping the flag to her, ordered the flag should always be placed in her chapel. A fortress named Our Lady of Miracles was built and Jaffna was established the capital of the new kingdom . Our Lady of Miracles Jaffna  was solemnly proclaimed the Protectress of the kingdom.

On 20 February 1627, the Saturday before the first Sunday in Lent, a great natural disaster struck Jaffna. Rain and wind continued through Sunday and Monday and people took refugee inside the church of Our Lady of Miracles to protect them.  The sea had raised very high and waves battered against the walls and a ten-foot storm surge penetrated interior rushing with great noise tearing down houses of the town. When the wave reached the church it divided in two and church remained surrounded by high walls of water rushing with great fury. The tiles of the church were scattered like dried leaves and the building itself received severe shaking three times. As the water level rose and reached the front of the church it caused great panic. The friars began to recite the Litany of the Blessed Virgin Mary and one friar and few devotees supposed to have noticed Our Lady place her hand under the feet of infant Jesus she carried in her arms, as if she was about to embrace him. From that moment the waters ceased to advance and wind began to lose its strength. The wind and raising waters swept vessels inland and many houses, building as well all the churches were destroyed in Jaffna except the church of Our Lady of Miracles. For the next ten days the soldiers and the Religious went about burying the dead,  helping the homeless, the sick and the dying. On 22 March, de Oliveria  died and was buried in the Main Chapel of the church of Our Lady of Miracles.

The moon adored the King and Queen of the Universe in Jaffna patão 

In the year 1622 the Pasch of the Resurrection fell on the 27th March, and the Procession set out with the Most Holy Sacrament of the Altar, and before it the feretory of Our Lady of Miracles and another of St Anthony, with all possible pomp.  When the Canopy of the Most Holy Sacrament began to move out of the church, the moon which was full, left her customary course in the lunar orbit and came down in the sight of all and, in the same proportion, at a proportionate altitude marched about six paces in front of the Most Holy Sacrament, turning into all the streets in Jaffna to accompany the King and Queen of Heaven. At the end of the Procession, when the Lord God in the Eucharist returned to the Church, the moon also returned to its place in the universe. The moon, on seeing God on earth, in order to adore its Creator in the sight of non- Christians and to confirm the Faith of the Neophytes,  it came down miraculously to reverence the Risen Christ. The moon participated in the procession without changing her face in her movements in the streets of Jaffnapatao. When the procession returned to the church, she stopped like the Star of the Magi above the church in the house of his Virgin Mother, and God was not in the manger but in the Most Holy Sacrament of the Altar.  On that Easter morning, by the glorious intercession of the Mother of our Creator, Jafanapatão saw the Majesty of Christ glory. ( Fernão de Queiroz, Manuscript, Book 4, Chapter 10, Page 558 )

Documented reports of miracles 

Friar Antonio learned Tamil and was fluent in the Tamil language. Friar Antonio sent a petition to the Captain and Judge of Jaffnapatao Amator Trauasos de Zouza in which he asked for a judicial inquiry into the credibility of the reported miracles. The Captain documented testimonies related to these miracles and was preserved in the Archives. Friar Paulo da Trindade obtained a copy of the testimonies of the witnesses. Friar Paulo da Trinidade, O.F.M. was Commissary General over Franciscans in India and Deputy of the Holy Office of Goa. Friar Trinidade’s chronicle "Conquista Espiritual do Oriente" describes in detail the work of Franciscans in India and in the neighbouring regions. A copy of the manuscript "Conquista Espiritual do Oriente" is preserved in the Vatican Library and bears the number: Cod. Lat. No. 7746. The Chapters 46, 52, 53 and 54 of Volume III of Conquista Espiritual do Oriente provide detail information on this famous statue of Our Lady of Miracles Jaffnapatao.

Similar to Mahavamsa, the chronicles of Sri Lanka history maintained by the Buddhist monks, the Portuguese missionaries also maintained chronicles of Ceylon history. Jesuit priest Fernão de Queiroz, provided detail records of Ceylon history. In his book Vol II, Book 4, he wrote three full chapters (chapters 8, 9 and 10) about Our Lady of Miracles, Jaffnapatão.

Persecution of Catholics and obstacles for missionary apostolate, 1500–1800 AD 

The history of Our Lady of Miracles Jafanapato reflect on life of Catholics in Ceylon during the above period.

The remarkable resemblance between the Anuradhapura Cross and the Bleeding Cross of St Thomas in Chennai and the baptismal pond near Vavuniya prove the presence of ancient Christianity in the 5th century. Kings of Anuradhapura Kingdom granted edict of tolerance and allowed Christians to organize and worship freely. It was an era towards a Dharmista Society.  Unfortunately later when Portuguese established trading links and Catholic missionaries began evangelizing people, it resulted in persecution of Catholics and obstacles for evangelization until Portuguese established their rule in Ceylon. When Portuguese began losing territories in Ceylon to Dutch, Dutch began to persecute Catholics and tried to eliminate Catholicism in Ceylon.

In 1658, Portuguese lost their last stronghold in Ceylon, Fort of Our Lady of Miracles (Fortaleza de Nossa Senhora dos Milagres de Jafanapatão) to the Dutch East India Company.  With the fall of Jaffna Fort, the Dutch took Portuguese as prisoners of war. Dutch rulers expelled all Portuguese from Ceylon which other rulers previously attempted but failed. The Portuguese prisoners of Jaffna were subjected to many ill –treatment, hardship and scrutiny by the Dutch and many prisoners died on their voyage when they were shipped to Batavia and Malacca.  Despite keen scrutiny to which the Dutch subjected the Portuguese prisoners, they managed to smuggled with them the statue of Our Lady of Miracles to Batavia.  Even after reaching Batavia and Malacca, prisoners continued to be subjected to ill treatment that violated the contemporary norms such as jailing Portuguese together with the native Javanese, chaining and forcing them to perform heavy labor, forbidding Catholic icons, forcing orphans and widows to attend Dutch churches and by not providing adequate food, clothes, shelter& medical care. In 1661, the statue of Our Lady of Miracles Jaffnapatao, was taken to Portuguese Goa in India, she was carried in a public procession to the convent of St Francis of Assisi, and kept in one of its chapels. The statue is now preserved in the church of Sao Pedro situated along the Mandovi river in Bainguinim, Goa and Damaon, India.

The Dutch ruled Ceylon for 140 years, but only extended some tolerance towards Catholics at the end of their rule. During the Dutch period in Ceylon Catholic faith was proscribed, church properties confiscated and priests were banished. Dutch issued a proclamation punishable with death any person harbouring or giving protection to a Roman Catholic priest. Catholic schools and churches were forced to convert to Calvinism by the Dutch Reformed Church. The confiscated  bells of Our Lady of Miracles Jaffnapatao (N S dos Milagres de Jaffnapatao 1648, and the Nossa Senhor Dos Milagres) became part of Dutch church (Kruys Kerk) inside the fort. https://commons.wikimedia.org/wiki/File:ChurchBell.jpg#filelinks

Catholicism seemed to have disappeared visibly with the Portuguese. Catholics strengthened their faith despite being subjected to oppression, humiliation& impoverishment by the  Calvinists of the Dutch Reformed Church. Many Catholic families migrated from Jaffna and from other Dutch governed areas. Catholics from Manthai fled into Wanni wilderness with the statue of Our Lady of Good Health, Manthai. A daughter of a Portuguese captain named Helena, built a small church to house the statue of Our Lady of Manthai, and the place was called Silena Maruntha Madhu which then evolved to be the Shrine of Our Lady of Madhu. Some Catholics in the south, fled with the statue which is now in the Shrine of Our Lady of Matara. The statue of Our Lady of Matara came over the waves inside a wooden crate, untouched by sea waters to care for the people of Ruhunu Rata.

Yet Catholicism considered a dying faith under Dutch colonisation experienced remarkable revival. The underground missionaries from Goa like Joseph Vaz worked in Jaffna, Kandy, and St Anne Talawila- Puttalam and laid the foundation towards a national Catholic church in Ceylon. Saint Joseph Vaz was imprisoned by false accusation of Huguenots (Calvinist) of being a Portuguese spy and he used that time in prison to learn Sinhala language.  In 1693, Saint Joseph Vaz as a prisoner in Kandy performed a miracle of rain during a severe drought and the King of Kandy in exchange released him and offered him protection and the freedom to preach the Gospel in the Kingdom of Kandy. In a similar incident, fishermen protecting and refusing to hand over Fr. Antonio to Dutch pursuers were expecting Fr. Antonio to prevent sea erosion. Fr Antonio planted a cross at the location most threatened by sea waves and on the third day waves receded and protective sand bank surfaced. The Dutch witnessing the miracle, allowed Fr Antonia to live there and built a church that is now St Anthony’s Shrine, Kochchikade.

In 1544, Saint Francis Xavier baptized over 10,000 people in 13 villages along the Travancore coast and gave each a Portuguese name written in Tamil. He learned to teach prayers like Nicene Creed, Lord’s Prayer, Hail Mary, Hail Holy Queen (Salve Regina) in Tamil. In  the same year when St. Francis Xavier was in Punnaikayal, south India a deputation from villages like Careapatao in Patim, Mannar  came to express their interest to become Catholics  and  invite him to Mannar.  The saint couldn’t go and he send a cleric whose name was also Francis  Xavier who with great zeal preached the faith  and successfully baptized the people in the villages of Patim. Island of Mannar was under  Jaffna  and the king’s brother, the rightful heir to the Jaffna kingdom  lived in exile fearing his brother’s cruelty.  He and his leading men wished to become Christians and wanted Portuguese help to regain his throne. The adversaries of the new faith fear mongered and warned King of Jaffna, Cankili I (Sekarasasekaran/Sankili I) unless he takes prompt action against these converts in Mannar,  he will  soon lose his kingdom to Portuguese. Losing Manna’s strategic location create economic and security risk for Jaffna. Sangili I  swore not to leave any Catholic converts alive and recruited about 5000 men and personally lead a military contingent to Mannar. Sangili issued an edict ‘renounce Christianity or die’ and the order of horrible slaughter was executed with much cruelty without distinction of age, gender or status.  Children cried out when their mothers tried to hide them from seeing their companions beheaded. There was no resistance and the new converts inspired by the power of faith offered their throat to the executors to be beheaded. Cleric Francis Xavier, IIam Singha (Uracinga) a sort of Governor/ tributary prince of Mannar and those serving Jaffna King in Mannar bravely confessed their catholic faith and were put to the sword. Between 600 to 700 were martyred and the Massacre of the Manarese seemed to have happened between October  and  December 1544. In 1548, St Francis Xavier landed in Mannar and kissed the ground where Catholics were martyred. He then went to Jaffna and asked king Sankili I to stop harming and harassing Catholics. St. Francis Xavier couldn't trust Sankili I and as he was leaving Jaffna on his way to Galle, he said " Unhappy island how many dead bodies will cover your shores and with how much blood will you be inundated". Those who fled in 1544 to the mainland  began  returning to Patim in 1561 and the Catholic community flourished until Dutch began persecuting them. Dutch conquered Mannar Fort in 1658 and the missionaries and Catholic families  then fled as refugees to Jaffna.

Historical documents mention Patim (Patti/Paddi) as the place of martyrdom. The missionary Henrique Henriques (Anrique Anriquez), who arranged Tamil Christian doctrine, was a parish priest in Mannar (1561–1564). Writing from Mannar in 1561, he mentioned  Patim village was half a league from  Mannar  Fort.  In July 1945,  Rev. Dr. P.A.J.B. Antoninus  and his team used  ancient maps for excavation and succeeded in locating Patim site. It is known to local residents as Paddi Taravai, located at the second mile post, half mile west of  Fort – Talaimannar road.  On further excavation Fr. Antoninus’s team found the church altar and several skeletons, including those of children, lying in all direction. Others heads got separated.  Part of the bones on the edges showed reddish colour.  Earlier in 1924, Frs. Delandes and Stanislaus excavation at Thoddaverly led to believe Thoddaverly as the burial place of Catholic martyrs and build a church in honour of  Queen of Martyrs, Mannar.

In 1543–1544 when Governor Martim Afonso de Sousa was near the island with a powerful fleet, Sankili I agreed to Portuguese conditions for peace, yet he indirectly continued to harm Catholics and Portuguese interest.  In the south, Veediya Bandara (Weedeya Raja), the son–in-law of King Bhuvanekabahu VII tortured and executed Catholics and missionaries, burned their houses and churches. Missionaries had to hide in the jungles for protection.  He then fled north and joined King Sankili I to get rid of Catholicism and Portuguese from the island. Friar Belchoir de Lisboa and four of his companions were the first friars to preach the faith in Jaffnapatao and were martyred. While the friar was being tortured, the king asked why he wept, and the friar replied considering the misery who being a king choose to remain a slave to the devil. The 1560 expedition by Viceroy Dom Constantino de Braganza to subdue Sankili I failed, yet, fearing a more powerful expedition, he agreed to all the Portuguese conditions. One of the articles of the treaty stated that no impediment should be placed on those who wish to embrace Christianity.

St. Francis Xavier met King of Kotte Bhuvanekabahu VII of Sri Lanka in Kotte and in Kandy met King Jayaweera, King of Kandy asking them to allow missionary work. Kings were more interested in getting a Portuguese garrison to protect themselves than spreading the Gospel or protecting Catholics. There were Catholic communities in the west coast from Jaffna to Welligama and on the east coast in places like Trincomalee. King Bhuvanekabahu VII told St Francis Xavier if he get baptized people will rebel against him and for the same reason he can’t allow much freedom to the Franciscans to preach the gospel to his subjects. Yet he told the saint he would cease obstacles to Franciscans if Viceroy protect his kingdom and him.  The Moors, whose support Mayadunne depended on, were interested in taking over the whole island while Portuguese were only interested in trade and breaking up Moors trade monopoly. King Bhuvanekabahu's strategy was to use Portuguese against Mayadunne of Sitawaka and his Moorish allies for his own protection and not let neither take control of his kingdom. Once a sorcerer advised King Bhuvanekabahu to get rid of all the Franciscans. Fr John de Villa Conde who was residing in the palace and teaching king’s grandson told the king he would show the truth of Catholic faith and asked a large pile of wood to be set on fire in the courtyard of the palace. He then walked into the pyre and standing midst of the flame he asked the sorcerer to follow him. The sorcerer hesitated but the king had him seized and thrown into the fire from which he emerged burnt while flame did not even touch the friar’s cloth. Though the king venerated the friar he still refused Franciscans a greater freedom in exercising their apostleship. King Bhuvanekabahu's grandson King Dharmapala of Kotte had the courage to be baptized and rule as a Catholic King.

History of Sri Lanka cover over two thousand years of monarchy rule. During the Portuguese Ceylon, some members of the Royal family of Kandy, Kotte and Jaffna kingdoms baptized and embraced the new faith. Some of those baptized escaped to avoid persecution and some were martyred. Prince Jugo, the eldest son of King Bhuvanekabahu VII  was killed by the king  because the prince  wanted to become a Christian. People saw a " cross of fire " in the sky and in the place where he was killed the earth opened in the form of a cross. These signs moved many people to the new faith. King Cankili II (Sankili Kumaran/ Sankili II) tried to get the help of Dutch, Moors and Thanjavur to defeat the Portuguese but failed. In 1619, after being defeated, Sankili II was captured and taken to Goa for trial. While in prison Sankili II sent for the Superior of the Franciscan Fathers. Sankili told the priest he learned Christian faith and had great veneration for Fr. Peter of Betancourt but didn't want to be baptized because of his ambition to rule and was afraid of the people. King Sankili II told the priest, he will lose his life but want to save his soul and that it is better to be a Catholic coolie than a pagan king. He was baptized as Don Philip. He passed his last days in sincere repentance for his atrocities he had committed and his eyes fixed on the Crucifix.  His wife, like King Sankili Sekarasasekaran’s brother and sister devoted their life to the work of charity in Goa.  The last prince to the Jaffna throne was young Dom Constantino and Portuguese had the intention to restore him the throne when he attained the age of majority. But prince Don Constantine choose a monastic life as a Franciscan friar, Constantine of Christ.

400-year devotion to Our Lady of Miracles Jaffnapatao 

Once during the feast of Our Lady, the Capitan Major Phillippe de Oliveira suggested the statue of Our Lady of Miracles be carried in procession. A priest respecting his wishes and by prostrating before Our Lady said in a loud voice " My Lady, punish not my boldness but cast thy eyes on the devotion with which thy devout Captain and these people wish to put thee in possession of this kingdom of which thou art the Patroness and Refuge". He then kissed the feet of the statue and when he placed his hand on the statue and took it away from the niche, he felt no weight of the statue. The priest in much astonishment turned to people who were on their knees and said " Praise God, Gentleman, in the most scared Virgin, for she carries herself" and he placed the statue on the feretory. This priest later affirmed to all that he felt no weight and that he felt like carrying a feather in his hand. This miracle was confirmed again for all to see at the time of restoring the statue to its niche. The priest in the presence of the people said" Let us go, my Queen and my Lady, to thy niche place." and as he was going to place his hand on the statue to raise it from the stand on which it stood,  Our Lady rose by herself and placed herself in his hands and all were amazed to witness this miracle.  People thanked and praised God and Our Lady of Miracles because so much of joy was observed in her face at the time of the procession. That way she showed her acceptance as Patroness of Jaffna Kingdom.

From 1614 to 1658 when the statue was in Jaffna, the devotees daily praised Our Lady of Miracles, singing the hymns with versicle and oration the  "O Gloriosa Domina" in the morning, "Ave Maris Stella" in the afternoon and at night chanting Litanies beginning with the verse "Tota Pulchra es Maria". One Christmas night when they were singing the hymn Te Deum, and when they were singing the verse "Tu ad liberandum suscepturus hominem, non horruisti Virginis uterum", all those present supposed to have seen the statue of Our Lady of Miracles Jaffnapatao beautiful and resplendent, and her whole face lit up with joy. Every year on her feast day, the statue adorned with precious jewels was taken in a procession through the streets of the town.

Devotion to Our Lady of Miracles Jaffnapatao resumed in 1661 at St. Francis of Assisi Church in Goa, and now annually at the chapel of Nossa Senhora de Piedade in Goa, India. By the Rivers of Mandovi, devotees continue to pray to Our Lady of Jaffnapatao that the words of their mouth and the meditation of their heart be pleasing to Prince of Peace

Some scholars based on written records and authentic traditions believe the devotional relationship between the people of Indo-Ceylon and Virgin Mary – Apostles began with the rising of the Star of Bethlehem. Historian Joao de Barros had mentioned that a king of the island of Ceilam was one of the three kings, the Biblical Magi who went to Bethlehem to worship the King of the Jews and that he came back with a portrait of Virgin Mary ( de Barros. Decade III, Book VII Chapter XI). Nestorian Cross discovered in Anuradhapura in 1912 prove the presence of Nestorian Christians in Sri Lanka from early times coupled with the traditional legend had Apostle Thomas preached from the hillock where the present St Thomas Church Gintupitiya stands.  The 6th century traveller Comos Indicopleustes  mentioned  “ Even in Taprobane where the Indian Sea is, there is a Church of Christians with clergy and body of believers” ( Christian  Topography, Book iii page 118-119).The devotees at San Thome Basilica in Chennai and the Basilica of Our Lady of Good Health in Velankanni Town both in Tamil Nadu, India were miraculously saved from the 2004 tsunami waves. According to the legend, St Thomas the Apostle planted a wood (St. Thomas Miraculous Post) at the top of the steps leading to San Thome Basilica and said sea would not pass that point.

Presently, the Novena to Our Lady of Miracles Jaffnapatao begins nine days before her feast. The statue is moved daily from São Pedro Church to the chapel of Nossa Senhora de Piedade (Our Lady of Pity) for the Novena. The feast of Our Lady of Miracles Jaffnapatao is celebrated on the first Sunday of May.

References

Other references 

 Trinidade, Paulo da, chapters 1 to 56 of vol. III of Conquista Espiritual do Oriente, translated by E. Peiris and A. Meersman as Chapters on the Introduction of Christianity to Ceylon. Chilaw, 1972
 Fernão de Queiroz. A Conquista Temporal e Espirtual de Ceilão.
(The Temporal & Spiritual Conquest of Ceylon). Vol. II, Book 4, Chapters 8, 9 & 10.
 History of Ceylon. An Abridged translation of Professor Peter Courtenay's work.  By M.G. Francis
 George Schurhammer" Ceylon zur Zeit des Konigs Bhuvaneka Bahu und Frans Xavers " 1539–1552

 The Martyrs of Mannar (From Authentic Documents). Father A.J.B Antoninus, O.M.I.  General Publishers Ltd. 20 Parson's Road, Fort, Colombo.

External links 

 Ceylon Today.  Lost & found. The story of a sacred image 
 The Messenger: Where is this miraculous image? Page 7. http://www.queenofangels.lk/messenger/13-05-2012-messenger.pdf
 Notes on Jaffna. John H. Martyn. Pages 138- 141.  https://books.google.com/books?id=xoIcCReqErUC&pg=PA141
  H.P.I.P. Our Lady of Pity (Piedade), Panelim: Religious Architecture.  http://www.hpip.org/Default/en/Homepage/Entry?a=643
 Chapters on the introduction of Christianity to Ceylon: taken from the Conquista [e]spiritual do Oriente of Friar Paulo da Trinidade [sic] O.F.M. https://books.google.com/books?id=ftQcAAAAMAAJ&q=our+lady+of++miracles+
 History of Ceylon. An Abridged translation of Professor Peter Courtenay's work.  By M.G. Francis. Page 285. https://books.google.com/books?id=J3vhBYsssYoC&printsec=frontcover&source=gbs_ge_summary_r&cad=0#v=onepage&q=1614&f=false

Shrines to the Virgin Mary
Roman Catholic churches in Goa
Statues of the Madonna and Child
Statues in India
Churches in North Goa district
Indian sculpture